10 Lacertae (10 Lac) is a star in the constellation Lacerta. With an apparent magnitude of 4.9, it is located around  distant in the small Lacerta OB1 association.  It is a hot blue main-sequence star of spectral type O9V, a massive star that is currently fusing its core hydrogen.  It is a suspected Beta Cephei variable star.

10 Lacertae was one of the first O-type stars (along with S Monocerotis) to be defined as an anchor point for the MKK spectral classification; since the early twentieth century it has served as such a point. Specifically, the star is representative of O9V stars, meaning relatively cool O-type stars on the main-sequence.

10 Lacertae has an 8th magnitude companion about one arc-minute away.

References

Lacerta (constellation)
O-type main-sequence stars
Lacertae, 10
8622
111841
214680
BD+38 4826